Kim Barbara Nye (born 10 May 1961) is a former New Zealand association football player who represented her country.

Nye scored on her Football Ferns debut in a 2–0 win over Australia on 26 March 1985 and ended her international career with 16 caps and 3 goals to her credit.

Nye represented New Zealand at the Women's World Cup finals in China in 1991 playing all 3 group games; a 0–3 loss to Denmark, a 0–4 loss to Norway and a 1–4 loss to China, in which she scored New Zealand's only goal of the tournament.

References

External links

1961 births
Living people
New Zealand women's international footballers
New Zealand women's association footballers
1991 FIFA Women's World Cup players
Women's association football defenders